The National Lacrosse League Teammate of the Year Award is given annually to an NLL player chosen by his peers.

Past winners

Footnotes

Teammate
Awards established in 1916